The Tupolev Tu-360 was a proposed hypersonic strategic bomber conceived by the Tupolev design bureau in the 1980s. It utilized most of the same technologies as the Tupolev Tu-2000.

Design and development
The Tupolev OKB intended the Tu-360 as a potential replacement for the Tupolev Tu-160, like the Mach 4 Tupolev Tu-230. Although some sources refer to it as the Tupolev Tu-2000B, largely because it utilized the same liquid hydrogen ramjet engine technology as the Tu-2000, it was officially called Tu-360 in the project index. The Tu-360 had the same layout as the Tu-230 but was much larger and faster. Speeds at Mach 6 required the use of liquid hydrogen, and the weapons were to be housed in two bomb bays. Take-off weight was projected at around 350,000 kg, weapons load at 10,000 kg. Tupolev planned to build a subscale technology demonstrator weighing 176,370 pounds (80,000 kg) to test the flight characteristics of the Tu-360, but a lack of funds following the fall of the Soviet Union meant that the project was axed in 1992.

Specifications

References

External links

 SPACE TRANSPORT: Tupolev Tu-2000 Hyperplane – Russia

Tu-0360
Delta-wing aircraft
Abandoned military aircraft projects of the Soviet Union
Scramjet-powered aircraft
Hypersonic aircraft